Judith Young may refer to:
 Judith Young (swimmer)
 Judith Young (astronomer)
 Judy Lewis, born Judith Young, American actress